Prauserella is a Gram-positive, aerobic and non-motile genus from the family of Pseudonocardiaceae.

References

Further reading
 
 

Pseudonocardiales
Bacteria genera